Danilo Vicente Aceval Maldonado (born 15 September 1975) is a retired Paraguayan football goalkeeper. He represented his native country at the 1998 FIFA World Cup.

International
Aceval made his international debut for the Paraguay national football team on 14 May 1995 in a Copa Paz de Chico draw against Bolivia (1-1), substituting for Jorge Battaglia. He was selected to the Paraguayan for the 1998 FIFA World Cup.

Aceval obtained a total number of eleven international caps.

External links

Career history at Weltfussball.de

1975 births
Living people
Paraguayan footballers
Paraguayan expatriate footballers
Paraguay international footballers
Association football goalkeepers
People from Cordillera Department
Liga MX players
Paraguayan Primera División players
Cerro Porteño players
Club Olimpia footballers
Tigres UANL footballers
Ñublense footballers
Deportes Concepción (Chile) footballers
Unión de Santa Fe footballers
Expatriate footballers in Argentina
Expatriate footballers in Chile
Expatriate footballers in Mexico
1998 FIFA World Cup players
1995 Copa América players
1999 Copa América players